The 2019 Judo Grand Prix Hohhot was held in Hohhot, China, from 24 to 26 May 2019.

Medal summary

Men's events
Source:

Women's events
Source:

Medal table

References

External links
 

2019 IJF World Tour
2019 Judo Grand Prix
Judo